Sparrowhawk is a name applied to several bird species.

Sparrowhawk  or sparrow hawk may also refer to:

Ships
 HMS Sparrowhawk, the name of several ships belonging to the Royal Navy of the United Kingdom
 Sparrowhawk, a mercantile barque, later coal lighter, formerly HMS Sparrowhawk (1856)
Sparrow Hawk (pinnace), an English ship that wrecked on Cape Cod in New England in 1626, and is currently owned by the Pilgrim Hall Museum

Aircraft
 AAI Sparrowhawk, a two-seat homebuilt gyroplane
 Curtiss F9C Sparrowhawk, a light biplane fighter aircraft, formerly carried by the United States Navy airships USS Akron and USS Macon
 Gloster Sparrowhawk British single-seat fighter aircraft
 Miles Sparrowhawk, British single-seat racing and touring monoplane
 Savoia-Marchetti S.M.79 Sparviero (Sparrowhawk in Italian), a three-engined Italian medium bomber
 Soko J-20 Kraguj (English: Soko J-20 Sparrowhawk), Yugoslavian light ground-attack and training aircraft
 Windward Performance SparrowHawk, a high-performance ultralight sailplane
 Sparrowhawk, the call sign given to civilian aircraft carrying members of the British Royal Family or which has 'royal flight' status

Other uses
 Operation Epervier (English: Operation Sparrowhawk) (1986–present), codename for the French military presence in Chad
 Sparrowhawk Hill, Cayman Islands
 Sparrowhawk Media, British media company
 Sparrowhawk, a series of novels by Edward Cline
 Mount Sparrowhawk, Canadian Rockies
 The common name of Ged (Earthsea), main protagonist in the Earthsea novels by Ursula Le Guin